Giacomo Gagini (also Gaggini) (15 December 1517 – 25 June 1598) was an Italian sculptor of the Gagini family.

Born in Palermo, he was the son of the sculptor Antonello Gagini, and the brother of Fazio and Vincenzo, and half-brother of Giovanni Domenico and Antonino Gagini, all sculptors.

He started to collaborate with his father at an early age, including the work at the Palermo Cathedral. In 1536 he sculpted two statues for the church of San Francesco di Paola and, in 1537, the Omodei tomb in the church of San Francesco d'Assisi. In 1544, also in the Palermo Cathedral, he sculpted the archbishop's throne, together with his brother Fazio and others. He also produced numerous works in the province of Palermo (Trapani, Alcamo, Sinagra, Naro, Pettineo).

He died at Palermo in 1598.

Sources

1517 births
1598 deaths
Artists from Palermo
Italian sculptors
Italian male sculptors